Zvonimir Lončarić (13 March 1927 – 11 November 2004) was a Croatian sculptor and painter.

In 1955, he graduated from the Academy of Applied Arts at the University of Zagreb.
Between 1958 and 1978, Lončarić directed four animated films for Zagreb Film, and was also the art director of 19 animated and feature films, among them Surogat, Dušan Vukotić's 1961 Academy Award-winning animated short.

References

External links
Lončarić, Zvonimir at enciklopedija.hr 

1927 births
2004 deaths
Artists from Zagreb
Academy of Fine Arts, University of Zagreb alumni
Croatian animators
Croatian sculptors
Vladimir Nazor Award winners
20th-century sculptors
20th-century Croatian painters
Croatian male painters
20th-century Croatian male artists